Colbjørn Henry Helander (September 7, 1911 – January 13, 1962) was a Norwegian screenwriter and translator.

Helander was originally a publisher, but in 1949 he was employed as a literary consultant at Norsk Film. Two years later, he became its managing director. Helander debuted as a screenwriter in 1952 with the film Nødlanding. In addition to his screenplays, he worked as a translator. In 1960 he translated Jack Kerouac's novella The Subterraneans into Norwegian, publishing it as De underjordiske.

Filmography
 1952: Nødlanding
 1958: I slik en natt
 1959: Vår egen tid
 1961: Hans Nielsen Hauge
 1962: Lykke og krone

References

External links
 
 Colbjørn Helander at Filmfront
 Colbjørn Helander at the Swedish Film Database

1911 births
1962 deaths
Norwegian screenwriters
20th-century Norwegian translators